Bruno Ruffo (9 December 1920 – 10 February 2007 ) was an Italian Grand Prix motorcycle road racer born in Verona. He won three Grand Prix World Championships.

In 1949 he won the inaugural 250cc World Championship riding for the Italian Moto Guzzi factory.  During the 1950 season, Ruffo was annoyed that Moto Guzzi instructed him to let his teammate win the Championship that year while he finished third.  That same year, Ruffo rode a Mondial to claim the 125cc World Championship.  In 1951 he once again captured the 250cc World Champion with four victories.  Ruffo retired in 1952 after an accident and opened a successful vehicle hire business in Verona. He died at 86 years old.

Motorcycle Grand Prix results 
1949 point system

Points system from 1950 to 1968

5 best results were counted up until 1955.

(key) (Races in italics indicate fastest lap)

References

Italian motorcycle racers
500cc World Championship riders
250cc World Championship riders
125cc World Championship riders
Isle of Man TT riders
Sportspeople from Verona
1920 births
2007 deaths
250cc World Riders' Champions
125cc World Riders' Champions